Minuscule 387 (in the Gregory-Aland numbering), ε 205 (Soden), is a Greek minuscule manuscript of the New Testament, on parchment. Paleographically it has been assigned to the 12th century. 
It has marginalia.

Description 

The codex contains a complete text of the four Gospels on 298 parchment leaves. The text is written in one column per page, in 21 lines per page.

It contains Prolegomena, lectionary markings at the margin (for Church reading), subscriptions at the end of each Gospel, with numbers of stichoi.

Text 

The Greek text of the codex is a representative of the Byzantine text-type. Hermann von Soden classified it to the textual family Kr. Aland placed it in Category V.
According to the Claremont Profile Method it belongs to the textual family Kr in Luke 1 and Luke 20. In Luke 10 no profile was made. It creates textual pair with 1471.

History 

The manuscript was added to the list of New Testament manuscripts by Scholz (1794–1852).
It was examined and described by Giuseppe Cozza-Luzi.
C. R. Gregory saw it in 1886.

The manuscript is currently housed at the Vatican Library (Ottob. gr. 204) in Rome.

See also 

 List of New Testament minuscules
 Biblical manuscript
 Textual criticism

References

Further reading 

 

Greek New Testament minuscules
12th-century biblical manuscripts
Manuscripts of the Vatican Library